Jiří Polívka may refer to:
 Jiří Polívka (canoeist)
 Jiří Polívka (linguist)